Präparat is the eighteenth studio album by the Japanese experimental band Boris. The album was announced along with two other releases  The album features the participation of musicians like Michio Kurihara and Gisèle Vienne. It was previously released exclusively on vinyl only in Japan. A second Japan domestic pressing was released in April 2014. Since October 2, 2020 it is also available as a digital release on Bandcamp.

"Evil Stack 3" is part of a series of drone pieces across multiple Boris albums, including the Damaged split and Rock Dream.

Track listing

Personnel

 Takeshi - Vocals, Bass, and Guitar
 Atsuo - Drums and Percussion
 Wata - Guitar and Keyboards
 Gisèle Vienne - Spoken Word (on "Bataille Sucre")
 Michio Kurihara - Guitar (on "Evil Stack 3" and "Method Of Error")
 Written, Words, and Produced by Boris
 Recorded, Mixed, Photography, and Design by Fangsanalsatan
 Mastered by Soichiro Nakamura
 Shinobu Narita - Producer (on "Elegy" and "Canvas")
 Tadashi Hamada - Management

References

2013 albums
Boris (band) albums